Ariekanerpeton is an extinct genus of seymouriamorph from the lower Permian. Fossils have been found from Tajikistan representing over 900 individuals of various stages of ontogenic development. However, it is thought that none of these specimens are of fully mature animals as poor bone ossification is present and the neural arches are paired and disarticulated from the pleurocentra.

Ariekanerpeton is thought to have been more closely related to Discosauriscus and Seymouria than to Utegenia due to the absence of gastralia or a postorbital-supratemporal contact. However, it is not a member of the family Discosauriscidae or the family Seymouriidae. There are no dermal scales present on post-metamorphic specimens as there are on Discosauriscus. Lateral lines are present in the skulls of larval individuals but are lost soon after metamorphosis. Unlike Utegenia and Discosauriscus, Ariekanerpeton is thought to have inhabited relatively arid environments.

References

 The Age of Dinosaurs in Russia and Mongolia by Michael J. Benton, Mikhail A. Shishkin, David M. Unwin, and Evgenii N. Kurochkin
 Chinese Fossil Vertebrates by Spencer G. Lucas
 Amniote Origins: Completing the Transition to Land by Stuart Sumida and Karen L.M Martin

Seymouriamorphs
Permian tetrapods of Asia